Mountain unicycling is an adventure sport that consists of traversing rough terrain on a unicycle. Mountain unicycling (muni) is undertaken on similar terrain to mountain biking. However, muni requires much more attention to the microfeatures of the short distance in front of the wheel. Unicycles' lack of a freewheel means that descents must be controlled all the way, and the typical lack of a gear system (though two-gear hubs are available) prevents the rider from reaching high speeds. Muni usually takes place on specially designed unicycles, which are equipped with strong hubs, large, knobbly tires, high-grip pedals and rugged frames. Some are also equipped with rim or disc brakes, having the lever mounted under the nose of the saddle. The brake primarily helps to compensate the downhill-slope force, while more expert riders also use it to decelerate or stop.

Muni riders also need a few additional skills than required for either mountain biking or regular unicycling, with core strength, endurance and balance being key.

Skills 
The ability to jump over gaps or to stop pedaling to keep the crank clear of the ground features is helpful.

Highspeed gliding is a technique to rush down a smooth path with the feet off the pedals and braking with one shoe on the top of the tire.

Equipment 

The unicycle typically has broad tires with grippy profile, filled with medium air pressure. The grippy pedals may have a tilt front contour (viewed from the side). The cranks should not be too long – relative to the rim size – to maintain clearance from bigger stones on the ground. Rims are rather broad to be sturdy and may have bores between the spoke holes to save weight, as a typical trial bike wheel. The banana saddle is fixed (not spring suspended) on the fork and carries a front and back bumper made of stiff plastics. The front bumper is used by three fingers from underneath as a handle, when the rider jumps or dismounts – or falls.

The rider wears shoes with grip, uses a helmet and protectors at shins, knees and at least gloves on the hands.

A helmet camera needs a wide angle lens and picture stabilization, because the rider makes sudden and quick head movements to watch the trail.

Events 

 Muni events recognized by the International Unicycling Federation at Unicons are: cross-country, uphill and downhill with the possibility of North Shore downhill.
 In the United States, the California Mountain Unicycle Weekend and the Moab, Utah Muni Fest (ended as of 2009).
 In the UK, the British Muni Weekend (BMW).
 The first Colorado Munifest took place in October 2007, organized by Colorado Muni.
 The first Arizona Mountain Unicycle Weekend was held in February 2009, organized by the Arizona Unicycle Club.
 In Australia, Cross County and Downhill are included in UniNats, held by the Australian Unicycle Society every 12–18 months.

Gallery

Riders

Canada
 Kris Holm – Mountain unicycling pioneer and founder of Kris Holm Unicycles
 Ryan Kremsater

Austria
 Gerald Rosenkranz – First finisher of Red Bull Dolomitenmann on a unicycle (2015)
 Markus Pröglhöf

Germany
Lutz Eichholz

See also 

 Unicycle
 Unicycle trials
 Mountain biking

References

External links 
International Unicycling Federation

Unicycling
Cycle types
Articles containing video clips